Aleksandr Sergeyevich Karakin (born 6 March 1991) is a former Russian football defender.

Club career
He made his Russian Football National League debut for FC Khimki on 22 August 2011 in a game against FC Gazovik Orenburg.

References

External links
 
 

1991 births
Footballers from Moscow
Living people
Russian footballers
Association football defenders
FC Dynamo Moscow reserves players
FC Khimki players